WRTR (105.9 FM, "Talk Radio 105.9") is a radio station broadcasting a news/talk radio format. Licensed to Brookwood, Alabama, United States, the station serves the Tuscaloosa area. The station is currently owned by iHeartMedia, Inc. and the broadcast license is held by iHM Licenses, LLC. The station has studios located on 11th Street in Downtown Tuscaloosa, while it's transmitter is located on 40th Avenue.

The station started life as WACT-FM, and changed its call letters to the current WRTR-FM on March 31, 1997.

WRTR was known as "Tuscaloosa's Rock Station" and is the home of The Bob and Tom Show in West Alabama. Popular radio host Joe Elvis has hosted Afternoon Drive since 2002 and The Wild Bill Show airs every weeknight.

On May 4, 2009, WRTR changed their format to news/talk, simulcasting WACT (1420 AM), branded as "Talk Radio 105.9". Overnight, the station broadcasts the syndicated Coast to Coast AM hosted by George Noory.

References

External links

RTR
News and talk radio stations in the United States
Radio stations established in 1966
IHeartMedia radio stations
1966 establishments in Alabama